Camille is a 1984 television film based on the 1848 novel and play La Dame aux Camélias by Alexandre Dumas, fils. It was adapted by Blanche Hanalis and directed by Desmond Davis. It stars Greta Scacchi, Colin Firth, John Gielgud, Billie Whitelaw, Patrick Ryecart, Denholm Elliott and Ben Kingsley.

Plot
Marguerite Gauthier is a courtesan in 19th-century Paris and keeps company with aristocrats and men of riches. She falls deeply in love with a middle-class man, Armand Duval, and the lovers move away to the countryside.

Armand's father begs Marguerite not to ruin his son's hope of a career and position, she acquiesces and leaves her lover, letting him believe she is going back to her former lifestyle. Armand returns to live with his father.

Sometime later Armand returns to Paris and Marguerite sees him with another woman. She declares her love for Armand and the pair sleep together. In the morning Armand insults her by sending her money and then goes off to work in Egypt.

Later Armand learns that Marguerite is dying and returns to Paris. Marguerite is too ill to recognise him before passing away. The memory of Marguerite doesn't diminish with time. In the final scene Armand, now an old man, is putting flowers on Marguerite's grave.

Cast
 Greta Scacchi as Marguerite Gautier
 Colin Firth as Armand Duval
 John Gielgud as Duke de Charles
 Billie Whitelaw as Prudence Duvorney
 Patrick Ryecart as Gaston
 Ben Kingsley as Duval
 Denholm Elliott as Count de Nolly
 Rachel Kempson as Hortense 
 Ronald Pickup as Jean
 Julie Dawn Cole as Julie
 Natalie Ogle as Blanche 
 Richard Beale as Farmer 
 Kathy Staff as Flower Lady 
 Maurice Teynac as Joseph 
 William Morgan Sheppard as Captain
 Shelagh McLeod as Nicole

(Cast list from Cineplayer)

See also
Camille (disambiguation)

References

External links 
 
 
 

1984 television films
1984 films
British television films
Films about prostitution in Paris
Films based on Camille
1984 drama films
Films directed by Desmond Davis
Hallmark Hall of Fame episodes